Hendrikus "Hennie" Ardesch (29 October 194326 November 2019) was a Dutch professional footballer who played as a goalkeeper.

Career
Ardesch spent most of his career as backup goalkeeper, notably with ADO Den Haag from 1966 to 1967. Ardesch wanted to keep semi-professional status, as he focused on careers outside of football while he mostly trained with the reserves and youth teams of ADO. He made his debut with ADO in a 4–2 Eredivisie loss to Feyenoord on 24 September 1967, where he memorably let in a goal while suffering from a kidney stone. He almost signed with Atlético Madrid in 1971, but could not sign due to foreigner restrictions. On 12 March 1971, he was celebrated by ADO for his 250th appearance on the substitute bench.

Death
Ardesch died of a heart attack on 26 November 2019 at the age of 76.

Personal life
Ardesch's son-in-law Sander Westerveld, and grandson Sem Westerveld, are also professional football goalkeepers.

References

External links
 

1943 births
2019 deaths
Dutch footballers
Footballers from Enschede
Association football goalkeepers
Eredivisie players
FC Twente players
ADO Den Haag players
Go Ahead Eagles players
VVV-Venlo players
Dutch expatriate footballers
Dutch expatriate sportspeople in the United States
Expatriate soccer players in the United States
Golden Gate Gales players